Lyria doutei is a species of sea snail, a marine gastropod mollusk in the family Volutidae, the volutes.

Distribution
This marine species occurs on the Saya de Malha Bank in the Indian Ocean.

References

External links
 MNHN, Paris: holotype
 Bouchet, P. & Bail, P. (1991). Volutes from Saya de Malha Bank: the saga of Lyria surinamensis and a new species. The Nautilus. 105(4): 159–164.

Volutidae
Gastropods described in 1992